The Men's 100m Freestyle event at the 2006 Central American and Caribbean Games occurred on Friday, July 21, 2006 at the S.U. Pedro de Heredia Aquatic Complex in Cartagena, Colombia.

Records

Results

Final

Preliminaries

References

Men's 100 Free--Prelim results page from the official website for the 2006 Central American and Caribbean Games; retrieved 2009-06-29.
 Men's 100 Free--Final results page from the official website for the 2006 Central American and Caribbean Games; retrieved 2009-06-29.

Freestyle, Men's 100m